The Afghanistan National Institute of Music (ANIM) is a school of music in Kabul, Afghanistan. It was founded in 2010 by the Afghan-Australian ethnomusicologist Dr. Ahmad Naser Sarmast, and offers a curriculum combining the tuition of both Afghan and Western music. ANIM is a co-educational institute.

Per an agreement between Sarmast and the Afghan Ministry of Education, the school accommodates both exceptionally talented students and underprivileged children.

History 
In 2006, Dr. Ahmad Naser Sarmast, then a Research Fellow at the Monash School of Music and Asia Institute, of Australia's Monash University, returned to Afghanistan to assess the situation after many years of living in exile.

With a strong belief in the power of music and music education, a second trip was made in 2007 to discuss the implementation of the pilot project with the Afghan authorities and more precisely, the rebuilding of music education through establishing a dedicated music school for the most disadvantaged children of Afghanistan.

In April 2008, after two years of negotiations with Afghan authorities, Dr. Sarmast went again to Afghanistan to lead and implement the establishment of the Afghanistan National Institute of Music (ANIM).

Founded in 2010 by Dr. Ahmad Sarmast, the Afghanistan National Institute of Music (ANIM) is the first and only school of music in the country.

In 2013, ANIM's Afghan Youth Orchestra toured the United States, including performances at Carnegie Hall and the Kennedy Center.  In 2014, a suicide bomb attack at a student concert killed an audience member and the bomber, and injured many more including Sarmast, who was nearly killed and lost some of his hearing. In 2015, the first Afghan female conductor, 17-year-old Negin Khpalwak, held her first concert with an all-female ensemble.

, a third of the 250 students are female and the proportion is growing; in 2019, Sarmast will take its all-female Zohra Orchestra on a European tour.

In 2018, the Afghanistan National Institute of Music and Ahmad Sarmast were awarded the Polar Music Prize.

References

Music schools in Afghanistan
Schools in Kabul
2010 establishments in Afghanistan
Music schools in Asia
Educational institutions established in 2010
Education in Kabul